The École Nationale Supérieure d'Électronique et de Radioélectricité de Grenoble, or ENSERG,
was a grande école located in Grenoble, France. ENSERG was part of the Institut National Polytechnique de Grenoble, also called INPG. Its activity was transferred in 2008 in the new school Phelma.

Research
5 research labs were attached to the ENSERG:

 ICP : Institut de la Communication Parlée (Institute for Spoken Communication).
 IMEP : Institut de Microélectronique, Electromagnétisme et Photonique (Institute for Microelectronics, Electromagnetism and Photonics).
 LIS : Laboratoire des Images et des Signaux (Picture and Signal Laboratory).
 CLIPS : Communication Langagière et Intéractions Personne-Systèmes (Language Communication and Human-System Interaction).
 TIMA : Technique de l'Informatique, de la Microélectronique pour l'Architecture des ordinateurs (Technics of Computer Science, Microelectronics for Computer Architecture).

External links
The official PHELMA website

Electronique et de radioélectricité de Grenoble
Grenoble Tech ENSERG
Educational institutions established in 1958
Educational institutions disestablished in 2008
1958 establishments in France
2008 disestablishments in France